Karabin maszynowy wz. 36, also known as Karabin lotniczy uniwersalny wz. 36 ( and , respectively) was a Polish 7.9 mm calibre aerial machine gun of the 1930s. It was a further modified version of Karabin maszynowy wz. 33, itself a modification of the successful Ckm wz.30 multi-purpose HMG.

The major differences between wz. 33 and wz.36 included redesigned feeding mechanisms allowing for the weapon to be fed from both sides (and coupled on double mountings). It was fed by belt magazines of 100 bullets each.

Intended to become the main type of aerial machine gun in Polish service both as fixed wing- or nose-mounted and as turret-mounted weapon, due to the introduction of Karabin maszynowy wz. 37 it was to serve only in fixed mountings in such planes as LWS-3 Mewa, PZL.38 Wilk, PZL.46 Sum, PZL.45 Sokół, PZL.48 Lampart and PZL.50 Jastrząb. Nevertheless, a man-operated mounting was also developed and was used in PZL.43 and PZL.43A light bombers used by Bulgarian Air Force.

References 
  Karabin lotniczy uniwersalny wz. 36
  Info lotnicze
  Uzbrojenie wojska II Rzeczypospolitej

See also 
 Państwowa Fabryka Karabinów

7.92×57mm Mauser machine guns
World War II machine guns
Heavy machine guns
Machine guns of Poland
Science and technology in Poland
Aircraft guns